Manoviraj Khosla is an Indian fashion designer based in Bengaluru who retails under his eponymous label. He also works as a costume designer, whose work has featured in Indian films like Lessons in Forgetting.

Education
Khosla was educated at The Doon School in Dehradun, and then got a bachelor's degree in commerce from. St. Xavier's College, Kolkata. He then went to study fashion design at the American College for the Applied Arts in London.

Work
Khosla launched his label in 1990, first producing menswear and later expanding to include womenswear. In 1995, Khosla launched his first 'Kingfisher Line' in association with the UB Group. The Kingfisher Line was later reinterpreted and launched in different versions in 2003 and 2010. In 2011, Khosla showcased his line at the first Force India Octane Nights fashion show. Khosla's style draws inspiration from both Indian and Western aesthetics, and focuses on experimenting with various cuts and fabrics. In contrast to luxury Indian couture labels, Khosla ensures affordability of the pieces produced under his label.

References

External links

Indian male fashion designers
The Doon School alumni
American InterContinental University alumni
20th-century Indian designers
Living people
Clothing brands of India
University of Calcutta alumni
Artists from Bangalore
21st-century Indian designers
Indian costume designers
Year of birth missing (living people)